Martin Koch (born 22 January 1982) is an Austrian former ski jumper.

Career
Koch started his World Cup career in 1999 and finished in the top 3 in all ski jumping events eighteen times. This included two victories with the first being on 8 January 2011 in Harrachov. He also won a silver medal at the 2008 Ski Flying World Championships and six gold medals in team events at the 2006 Winter Olympics and World Championships. He made his last World Cup jump on 22 March 2014 on the large hill in Planica.

Regarded as a ski flying specialist, Koch held the Austrian national distance record with a jump of 241.5 metres in Vikersund in 2011, until this was beaten by countryman Gregor Schlierenzauer in the same event.

Koch is the nephew of Armin Kogler.

World Cup

Standings

Wins

Notes

References
 
  
 

1982 births
Austrian male ski jumpers
Living people
Ski jumpers at the 2002 Winter Olympics
Ski jumpers at the 2006 Winter Olympics
Olympic gold medalists for Austria
Olympic ski jumpers of Austria
Olympic medalists in ski jumping
FIS Nordic World Ski Championships medalists in ski jumping
Medalists at the 2006 Winter Olympics
Universiade medalists in ski jumping
Sportspeople from Villach
Universiade bronze medalists for Austria
Competitors at the 2005 Winter Universiade
21st-century Austrian people